The Merchants and Planters Bank is a historic commercial building at 214 Madison Street in Clarendon, Arkansas.  It is a handsome brick two-story building with Classical Revival styling, designed by the Arkansas architect Charles L. Thompson and built in 1921.  The main facade has a tall stone arch supported by Tuscan columns, with the main entrance recessed behind.  The top of the building has a parapet with a stone panel identifying the building, which has a stone eagle mounted on it.

The building was listed on the National Register of Historic Places in 1982.

See also
National Register of Historic Places listings in Monroe County, Arkansas

References

Bank buildings on the National Register of Historic Places in Arkansas
Neoclassical architecture in Arkansas
Buildings and structures completed in 1921
Buildings and structures in Monroe County, Arkansas
National Register of Historic Places in Monroe County, Arkansas